Gormgal of Ardoileán (died 1017) was an Irish cleric.

Biography

The monastery of Ardoileán, off the west coast of Ireland, was founded by Feichin in 664. It is now gone but on its site at Omey Island  sits a medieval church, completely buried in sand until it was excavated in 1981.

The monastery continued until at least the early 12th century, when the Annals of Ulster under the year 1017 state Gormgal of Int Ardailéan, chief confessor of Ireland, rested in Christ.

One of the important manuscripts of the Life of St. Feichin was written on the island.

See also

 Féchín of Fore died 665.
 Enda of Aran, died c. 530.
 Ceannanach, missionary, fl. c. 490-500?
 Gillagori Ua Dubhacan, Abbot of Aran, died 1167.

External links
 http://www.ucc.ie/celt/published/T100001A/
 http://irishislands.info/ard.html
 http://www.goireland.com/galway/high-island-early-monastery-attraction-monastery-id13019.htm
 https://query.nytimes.com/gst/fullpage.html?sec=travel&res=9B00E5D7113EF932A3575BC0A96F958260

Christian clergy from County Galway
11th-century Irish priests
1017 deaths
Year of birth unknown